Recenjak is a dispersed settlement  in the Pohorje Hills in the Municipality of Lovrenc na Pohorju in northeastern Slovenia. The area is part of the traditional region of Styria. It is now included in the Drava Statistical Region.

References

External links
Recenjak on Geopedia

Populated places in the Municipality of Lovrenc na Pohorju